Mutilation was a common method of punishment for criminals in the Byzantine Empire, but it also had a role in the empire's political life. By blinding a rival, one would not only restrict his mobility but also make it almost impossible for him to lead an army into battle, then an important part of taking control of the empire. Castration was also used to eliminate potential opponents. In the Byzantine Empire, for a man to be castrated meant that he was no longer a man—half-dead, "life that was half death". Castration also eliminated any chance of heirs being born to threaten either the emperor’s or the emperor's children's place at the throne. Other mutilations were the severing of the nose (rhinotomy), or the amputating of limbs.

Rationale
The mutilation of political rivals by the emperor was deemed an effective way of side-lining from the line of succession a person who was seen as a threat. Castrated men were not seen as a threat, as no matter how much power they gained they could never take the throne, and numerous eunuchs were entrusted with high and confidential offices in the Byzantine court and administration. In Byzantine culture, the emperor was a reflection of heavenly authority. Since God was perfect, the emperor also had to be unblemished; any mutilation, especially facial wounds, would disqualify an individual from taking the throne. An exception was Justinian II (ὁ Ῥινότμητος, "the slit-nosed"), who had his nose cut off when he was overthrown in 695 but was able to become emperor again in 705.

History
Blinding as a punishment for political rivals and a recognized penalty for treachery was established in 705, although Phocas used it earlier during his rule as well, becoming common practice from Heraclius onwards. Castration as a punishment for political rivals did not come into use until much later, becoming popular in the 10th and 11th centuries. An example is that of Basil Lekapenos, the illegitimate son of Emperor Romanos I Lekapenos, who was castrated when young. He gained enough power to become parakoimomenos and effective prime minister for three successive emperors, but could not assume the throne himself.

Cases of disfigurement

Annotations

References

Sources

 - Total pages: 343 
 - Total pages: 226 
 - Total pages: 245 
 - Total pages: 625 

 - Total pages: 256 
 
 
  - Total pages: 352 
  - Total pages: 441 
 
  - Total pages: 443
  - Total pages: 247 

  - Total pages: 389 
  - Total pages: 548 
  - Total pages: 342 
  - Total pages: 295 
 
 
 
  - Total pages: 264 
  - Total pages: 201 
 
 

Byzantine law
Corporal punishments
Mutilation